Sophia B. Warren is an American politician serving as a member of the Maine House of Representatives from the 29th district. She assumed office on December 2, 2020.

Early life and education 
Warren was born in Portland, Maine and raised in Scarborough. Warren attended Seeds of Peace International Camp as a teenager. She graduated from Catherine McAuley High School before earning a Bachelor of Arts degree in international and global studies from Brandeis University in 2019.

Career 
Warren served as a legislative intern in the office of Senator Angus King. She was also a deputy field organizer for the Bernie Sanders 2020 presidential campaign. She was elected to the Maine House of Representatives in November 2020 and assumed office the following month.

References 

Living people
Catherine McAuley High School alumni
Maine Independents
Maine Democrats
Members of the Maine House of Representatives
Women state legislators in Maine
Brandeis University alumni
People from Scarborough, Maine
Politicians from Portland, Maine
21st-century American politicians
21st-century American women politicians
Year of birth missing (living people)